Assault Battalion No. 5 (Rohr), was an experimental infantry battalion of the Imperial German Army during World War I. Under command of its namesake, Hauptmann Willy Rohr, It was known its innovative infantry tactics as part of the German High Command's attempt to break the stalemate of trench warfare. The battalion began as a combat engineer detachment of the 8th Army Corps, but was later expanded to a battalion and became one of Kaiser Wilhelm's favorite units.

Despite being the first incorporated German assault battalion, it received the ordinal designation of "5" due to the fact it originated from the 5th Army.

History

Sturmabteilung Calsow 

The 5th Assault Battalion began as an experiment of the VIII Army Corps, consisting of a detachment of two Pionier (sapper) companies designated Sturmabteilung Calsow (English: Calsow's Assault Detachment). Initially, the detachment was unsuccessful, as it was first utilized defensively at the French front line as emergency reinforcements. Due to the unit's failure, Major Calsow was relieved, and by September command was transferred to Hauptmann Willy Rohr of the Guards Rifles Battalion's 3rd Company under Army Detachment B. He abandoned the previous uses of gun shields and Sappenpanzer body armor, as well as requested the development of a lighter type of field gun. These guns were based on captured Russian fortress guns, which were used to fill the assault role before the new cannons could be produced. Rohr also reinforced the unit with a machine gun and flamethrower platoon to assist with supporting fire and trench clearing.

Once under full command of the Assault Detachment, Rohr put together what he had learned from previous experience and other similar experiments to craft new tactics for his unit's unique arsenal and training. He broke down the unit into squads of just a few men each and ensured they had good leadership and communication with their supporting weapons. The soldiers would charge through no man's land very quickly, utilizing hand grenades, pistols and flamethrowers to overwhelm enemy forces and secure a foothold in the trenches. These tactics would later come to be known by the German Army as Stoßtrupptaktik (English: "stormtrooper tactics"). The first use of Rohr's tactics in combat was actually by the 187th Infantry Regiment at the Vosges mountains. The Assault Detachment themselves first utilized these tactics at Hartmannswillerkopf, which had been lost on December 21, 1915. The Detachment initially encountered heavy resistance, but eventually broke through and captured the position after two days of assaults. Afterwards, the Assault Detachment spent the next two months training other units in Army Detachment B in the hopes of creating a force that could eventually break the stalemate of the Western Front. In February 1916, the unit was reassigned to the 5th Army to begin the German attack at the Battle of Verdun.

At the Battle of Verdun
The Assault Detachment formed the vanguard of the first German push into the trenches of Verdun, the first major deployment of the new force. The German forces began their attack shortly after the artillery barrage had ended, pushing the French forces out of the first line of trenches very quickly. The push into the second line of trenches was more costly, as the infantry had little knowledge of their layouts, but the attack was overall deemed a success. However, due to poor training, the unit suffered high casualties in the following days, and they were withdrawn from the front after a short time. Captain Rohr attributed the unit's casualties to their lack of experience with hand-to-hand combat and grenades, as well as poor coordination between supporting weapons and the infantry. He broached this information to the High Command of the 5th Army, and was ordered to re-train the unit in close-combat tactics. Following an inspection by Crown Prince Wilhelm, the unit was expanded to battalion size and renamed the Sturmbataillon.

Sturm-Bataillon 

As a battalion, the unit became a driving force in the adoption of Stoßtrupp tactics among the German Army. A training ground was constructed in the Doncourt forest near the French village of Doncourt-lès-Longuyon, where the Assault Battalion trained officers and other infantry units in the use of hand grenades, light cannons, machine guns and other new doctrinal elements. In addition to various standard infantry units, several Jäger battalions were converted into stormtrooper battalions. When not training other soldiers, the Assault Battalion was sent to hotspots on the German front, which came to be the dominant way of deploying assault units in the German Army during World War I. After a successful attack on French positions near the town of Revest-du-Bion at the Souville Gorge (French: Ravin de Fontaine) on September 3 of 1916, Rohr sent a report to Kaiser Wilhelm detailing the assault, about which the Kaiser was significantly pleased. He had visited the unit at their training grounds in August, so the Assault Battalion was awarded favored unit status and renamed Sturm-Bataillon Nr. 5 (Rohr) at the behest of the Crown Prince on February 7, 1917.

After being impressed by an honor guard of Rohr's stormtroopers stationed at the Crown Prince's headquarters, Quartermaster General of the Germany Army Erich Ludendorff ordered all field armies to form their own stormtrooper units on October 2, 1916.

On March 19, 1918, Captain Rohr went with the 5th Assault Battalion to the 18th Army Headquarters in Leschelle to prepare for one of Germany's final assaults during the First World War, Operation Michael. During preparations in April, Captain Rohr was promoted to Major.

Dissolution 
In October 1918, the 5th Assault Battalion was sent under secret orders to guard Kaiser Wilhelm, who had fled from Berlin due to political unrest to the Supreme Army Headquarters in Spa, Belgium. Under pressure from the SPD and growing revolutionary movement, Chancellor of Germany Prince Max von Baden ordered the Kaiser to abdicate so the Reichstag could end the war. Field Marshal Paul von Hindenburg convinced Wilhelm to do so, and on November 10 he fled into the Netherlands to live in exile. The remaining units in the Supreme Army Headquarters fled the following day to avoid being imprisoned by advancing Allied forces. The 5th Assault Battalion was demobilized near Schwelm. Following the end of World War I and the drafting of the Treaty of Versailles, most units of the German Army, including the Assault battalions, were dissolved to comply with the 100,000 man limit on the Reichswehr. Former stormtroopers found themselves with no military position, including Major Rohr, who was forced to take supply jobs as a lieutenant colonel. He later resigned as result. Many stormtroopers would later join the Black Reichswehr and other paramilitary organizations during the Weimar era.

Tactics 
The tactics that Rohr had been in large part responsible for developing were very similar to modern infantry tactics. Elements that would later become critical to the development of infantry warfare during and after World War II, like the use of squads, coordinated supporting fire and non-commissioned officers, were implemented by the Assault Battalions during World War I to great effect. The efficacy of the 5th Assault Battalions' tactics would later go on to inform German infantry doctrine during World War II, where many elements of "stormtrooper tactics" (such as the extensive use of both light and heavy machine guns and hand grenades) and were rolled into standard infantry units, with standard German squads consisting of a mix of short-range, long-range and fire-support weaponry.

Equipment 

The equipment of Rohr's stormtroopers primarily prioritized speed and agility, sacrificing some ammunition and protection for the ability to more quickly advance so as to cover no man's land in the shortest time possible. The unit also utilized weapons which were short and fast firing over weapons that could contend at long distances. This extends to pistols, which were also utilized extensively with drum magazines as trench-clearing weapons. Furthermore, towards the end of the war, the stormtroopers of Rohr's battalion were some of the first to be issued the MP-18, which proved effective in trench raids.

In December 1915, Rohr's unit implemented uniform changes to better address their unique battlefield challenges. The primary change was the replacement of army jackboots with Gamaschen leg wraps and M1914 Schnurschue ankle boots to improve foot mobility and comfort when moving across rough battlefield terrain. In addition, sandbags were emptied and converted into canvas bags to hold greandes, allowing a single soldier to carry several on his person without sacrificing room on his equipment belt. Tan canvas bags holding grenades would later become a distinctive uniform accessory of the Nazi Sturmpioniere during World War II, where they were worn usually under the shoulder or against the chest.

Legacy 

Since the German stormtroopers of World War I lost their positions when the Reichswehr was downsized, a large number sought some form of employment within various paramilitary groups during the Weimar era. Many former soldiers rejoined military service as members of the Freikorps, paramilitary units that were trained, equipped and led by the Reichswehr. After the failed Kapp Putsch, unemployed soldiers began to drift to right-wing militant groups like Der Stahlhelm, who catered to the worries of German veterans. Aspects of the extreme militaristic culture of German stormtroopers during World War I (such as the "stab-in-the-back myth") created conditions for extensive right-wing violence, which was in large part responsible for the rise of the Nazi party. The Nazis' Weimar-era paramilitary force, the SA, was staffed by many former stormtroopers and was named after the original title of the 5th Assault Battalion, the Sturmabteilung.

Notes

References 

Infantry units and formations
World War I
German Empire
Military units and formations of Germany in World War I
Special forces units and formations
Trench warfare
Types of military forces